Holland Charter Township is a charter township of Ottawa County in the U.S. state of Michigan. As of the 2017 Census estimates, the population stood at 37,979.

The City of Holland is adjacent to the south and is administratively autonomous.

Geography 

Communities 
Noordeloos is an unincorporated community located in the township.
Beechwood is a census-designated place located mostly within the township, with a small portion lying in adjacent Park Township.

Demographics 
As of the census of 2015, there were 44,351 people, 9,821 households, and 7,365 families living in the township. The racial makeup of the township was 79.22% White, 2.22% African American, 0.41% Native American, 7.91% Asian, 0.03% Pacific Islander, 7.57% from other races, and 2.65% from two or more races. Hispanic or Latino of any race were 15.82% of the population.

Of the 9,821 households 43.2% had children under the age of 18 living with them, 60.8% were married couples living together, 9.9% had a female householder with no husband present, and 25.0% were non-families. 19.6% of households were one person and 5.0% were one person aged 65 or older.  The average household size was 2.87 and the average family size was 3.32.

The age distribution was 31.3% under the age of 18, 10.4% from 18 to 24, 34.4% from 25 to 44, 16.8% from 45 to 64, and 7.1% 65 or older.  The median age was 29 years. For every 100 females, there were 102.0 males.  For every 100 females age 18 and over, there were 101.5 males.

The median household income was $49,458 and the median family income  was $54,027. Males had a median income of $40,417 versus $28,237 for females. The per capita income for the township was $19,671.  About 4.6% of families and 6.3% of the population were below the poverty line, including 7.5% of those under age 18 and 5.1% of those age 65 or over.

History 
The former village of Cedar Swamp, located in sections 27 and 28 of Holland Township, was platted and recorded in 1848 by Albertus van Raalte, who also founded Holland, Michigan. By 1853 the population of the township was 1,418. Initially,  Holland Township included present-day Park Township and Zeeland Township, with Zeeland Township breaking off in 1851.

References

External links 
 Holland Charter Township

Charter townships in Michigan
Townships in Ottawa County, Michigan